is the fifth in a series of six Japanese martial arts films based on the long-running Lone Wolf and Cub manga series about Ogami Ittō, a wandering assassin for hire who is accompanied by his young son, Daigoro.

Plot
On his travels on "the Demon Path in Hell", Ogami Itto is confronted by a series of five messengers who represent a clan wanting his services. Each assassin in turn administers a specific test of his abilities, and when bested gives Ogami partial payment for the job and, as per his usual stipulation, discloses some of the "secrets and reasons" for the killing. By the time Ogami has defeated all the messengers, he has been informed of a conspiracy to disguise a daimyōs illegitimate female offspring as a prince and heir to the clan, while the official offspring, a son, is kept imprisoned and concealed. A letter detailing the plot is being delivered by a high priest, who in reality is a "grass" or secret ninja agent, to the shōgun, which would mean the dissolution of the clan, leaving retainers, samurai, and vassals without support—a disastrous end. Ogami is to intercept the priest carrying the letter, kill him and retrieve the letter; the priest will be traveling under the protection of his arch-enemy, Yagyū Retsudō, further complicating the mission.

On a stopover at a town festival, Itto's three-year-old son, Ogami Daigoro, is separated from his father and has his own personal adventure when he gets mixed up with a notorious female pickpocket, named Oyo, being chased by constables. She gives him a stolen wallet to hold for her and asks him to promise not to tell anyone. Daigoro is arrested as her accomplice, but refuses to talk. The law officers publicly flog him in front of the townspeople, but Daigoro keeps his promise even after the pickpocket reveals herself and confesses. Finally the constables release him, impressed by his stoic courage and honor.

En route to intercept the priest, Ogami is contracted by a young woman, named Shiranui, to kill the retired lord, his concubine and the young daughter. Ogami, then in a skilled move, swims underwater to a boat containing the high priest and steals the letter. After securing the letter, he confronts the daimyo and after a brutal battle with the daimyo Seven Bodyguards, kills him, his concubine and the young girl, fulfilling his contracts. In the final scene, as Ogami takes Daigoro with him on a boat to sail away, Shiranui appears and before committing harakiri, that the official story will be that the retired lord committed seppuku, thus preserving the clan and order and allowing the concealed heir to assume his rightful place.

Cast
 Tomisaburo Wakayama as Ogami Ittō
 Akihiro Tomikawa as Daigoro
 Akira Yamauchi as Ayabe Ukon, Messenger 1
 Hideji Otaki as Mogami Shusuke, Messenger 2
 Taketoshi Naitô as Mawatara Hachiro, Messenger 3
 Fujio Suga as Kikuchi Yamon, Messenger 4
 Rokko Toura as Sazare Kanbei, Messenger 5
 Shingo Yamashiro as Lord Kuroda Naritaka
 Tomomi Sato as "Quick Change" Oyô
 Michiyo Ōkusu as Shiranui
 Koji Fujiyama as Tomekichi the Mole
 Sumida Kazuyo as Hamachiyo
 Bin Amatsu as Inspector Senzo
 Taizen Shishido as Izumi Kazuna
 Eiji Okada as Wakita
 Minoru Ōki  as Yagyu Retsudo

Release
Lone Wolf and Cub: Baby Cart in the Land of Demons was released theatrically in Japan on 11 August 1973 where it was distributed by Toho. The film was released on home video by Samurai Cinema, a division of AnimEigo with English subtitles on 20 July 1997.

Footnotes

Sources

External links
 
 

1973 films
Films directed by Kenji Misumi
Japanese martial arts films
Japanese sequel films
Live-action films based on manga
5
Toho films
1973 martial arts films
Films set in the Edo period
1970s Japanese films